Max Böhlen (1902–1971) was a Swiss painter. A large part of his work can be visited today in the hunting lodge, which the painter acquired in 1939 in Egerten for his family. His youngest son Andreas Böhlen still lives there and guides visitors through the exhibition rooms themselves.

References

This article was initially translated from the German Wikipedia

20th-century Swiss painters
20th-century Swiss male artists
Swiss male painters
1902 births
1971 deaths